The Lake House is a 2006 American fantasy romance film written by David Auburn and directed by Alejandro Agresti. A remake of the South Korean motion picture Il Mare (2000), it stars Keanu Reeves and Sandra Bullock, who last appeared together in the 1994 action thriller film Speed. The film revolves around an architect (Reeves) living in 2004 and a doctor (Bullock) living in 2006 who meet via letters left in the mailbox of a lake house where they both lived at separate points in time. They carry on a two-year correspondence while remaining separated by the time difference.

Plot 
In 2006, Dr. Kate Forster is leaving a lake house that she has been renting near Chicago. Kate leaves a note in the mailbox asking the next tenant to forward her mail, adding that the paint-embedded pawprints on the path leading to the house were there when she arrived.

Two years earlier, architect Alex Wyler arrives at the lake house and finds Kate's letter in the mailbox. The house is neglected, with no sign of paw prints anywhere. During the subsequent restoration of the house, a dog runs through Alex's paint and leaves fresh paw prints where Kate said they would be. Baffled, Alex writes back, placing the letter in the mailbox, asking how Kate knew about the paw prints since the house was unoccupied until he arrived. The dog, Jack, then becomes owned by both Kate and Alex within their different places in time. On Valentine's Day 2006, Kate witnesses a traffic accident near Daley Plaza and tries to save the male victim unsuccessfully. She impulsively drives back to the lake house, finds Alex's letter, and writes back.

Alex and Kate continue passing messages to each other via the mailbox and each watches its flag go up and down as the message leaves and the reply arrives as they wait. They then discover that they are living exactly two years apart. Their correspondence takes them through several events, including Alex finding a book, Jane Austen's Persuasion, at a railway station where Kate said she would have lost it and Alex taking Kate on a walking tour of his favorite places in Chicago via an annotated map that he leaves in the mailbox. Alex eventually meets Kate at her then-boyfriend's party, but he doesn't mention their exchange of letters because it has not happened to Kate yet.

As Alex and Kate continue to write to each other, they decide to try to meet again. Alex makes a reservation at the Il Mare restaurant – two years into Alex's future but only a day away for Kate. Kate goes to the restaurant, but Alex fails to show. Heartbroken, Kate asks Alex not to write to her again, recounting the accident earlier that day. Both Alex and Kate leave the lake house, continuing on with their separate lives.

On Valentine's Day 2006 for Alex, Valentine's Day 2008 for Kate, he returns to the lake house after something about the day triggers a memory. Meanwhile, Kate goes to an architect to review the renovation plans for a house she wants to buy. A drawing of the lake house on the conference room wall catches her attention, and Henry Wyler informs her the artist was his brother, Alex, and Kate realizes that this was the Alex with whom she had been corresponding. She also learns that Alex was killed in a traffic accident exactly two years ago and realizes why he never showed up for their date – he was the man who died in Daley Plaza.

Rushing to the lake house, Kate frantically writes a letter telling Alex she loves him but begs him not to try to find her if he loves her back. Wait two years, she says, and come to the lake house instead. Meanwhile, in 2006, Alex has gone to Daley Plaza to look for Kate. He stands across the street from the plaza, and just as it seems he is about to cross, he reaches into his pocket to look at a note from Kate.

At the lake house, Kate drops to her knees sobbing, fearing that she has arrived too late to stop Alex. Not long afterwards, a truck pulls up. She walks forward smiling as the driver approaches. She and Alex kiss and walk toward the lake house.

Cast 
 Keanu Reeves as Alex Wyler, a young architect who designs suburban condominiums. He has a strained relationship with his father Simon, a renowned but egocentric architect. Alex moves into the lake house even though he hates it and its impractical design.
 Sandra Bullock as Dr. Kate Forster, a physician who starts a new job at the Chicago hospital. She is the former tenant of the lake house. Her boyfriend is Morgan, whom she subsequently becomes engaged to and then breaks up with.
 Christopher Plummer as Simon Wyler, Alex's estranged, narcissistic father. He is a famous Chicago architect and the original designer of the Lake House.
 Ebon Moss-Bachrach as Henry Wyler, Alex's brother. He eventually opens his own architectural firm, Visionary Vanguard Associates.
 Shohreh Aghdashloo as Dr. Anna Klyczynski, Kate's older boss, mentor, and friend.
 Dylan Walsh as Morgan Price, Kate's boyfriend turned fiancé. He is pushy and persistent, and tends to make decisions for Kate. She eventually breaks up with him.
 Willeke van Ammelrooy as Mrs. Forster, Kate's mother and confidante.
 Lynn Collins as Mona, Alex's assistant who is romantically interested in him. He is indifferent to her constant advances.

Production 
Filmed and set in Chicago, production began in March 2005. The lake house itself was built on what is called Maple Lake, located within the Maple Lake Forest Preserve off of 95th Street in the southwest suburb of Chicago: Willow Springs. The house was actually built on dry land and then flooded to appear that it was in the lake. After filming, the house was required to be removed, and a simple fishing dock was put in its place. The downtown scenes are in The Loop. The scenes where Kate and Morgan go to Henry's office, and Kate's dramatic exit down the stairs, were filmed at the Chicago Architecture Foundation. The scene where Henry and Alex talk on the street after being in their father's office was filmed on the 400 block of South Michigan Ave, in front of the Fine Arts Building and the Auditorium Theater. The scene where Alex and Simon converse in Simon's home was filmed at the Prairie Avenue Bookshop, an architectural bookstore in Chicago which closed in 2009. Other filming locations include Aurora, Illinois (now the Madison Park community) and Riverside, Illinois, a suburb west of Chicago that is known for its historic houses, and several Frank Lloyd Wright buildings. The railway station in the movie is the real station of Riverside, and the bridge that Alex crosses while chasing Jack is called the "Swinging Bridge"; it crosses the Des Plaines River. The scene where Kate gets stood-up is in Millennium Park at the Park Grill. The bar scene in the Loop where Kate is seen sitting on the barstool, speaking with the woman at the wooden bar, is the real "Millers Pub" located at 134 S Wabash Ave, Chicago, IL 60603.

Music

An original motion picture soundtrack featuring songs used in the film, as well as a selection of original score cues composed and produced by Rachel Portman, was released digitally and in physical format on June 20, 2006, through Lakeshore Records in the United States. The score was orchestrated by Jeff Atmajian, with David Snell as conductor, and features strings, piano, guitar, and cello in its instrumentation. Recording and mixing was handled by Chris Dibble—with assistance from Jeremy Murphy—in London, with the former taking place at Air Studios in Lyndhurst, and the latter at Lansdowne Recording Studios.

Several other songs appeared in the film, but were not included on the soundtrack:
 "I Wish You Love" – Rosemary Clooney
 "There Will Never Be Another You" – Rosemary Clooney
 "Pink Moon" – Nick Drake
 "La noyée" – Carla Bruni
 "Sentimental Tattoo" – Jukebox Junkies
 "Chiamami Adesso" – Paolo Conte
 "When It Rains" – Brad Mehldau
 "Young at Heart" – Brad Mehldau
 "Almost Like Being In Love" – Gerry Mulligan
 "O Pato" – Stan Getz
 "A Man and A Woman" – Sir Julian
 "Bitter" – Meshell Ndegeocello

"Somewhere Only We Know" by Keane was used in the film's teaser trailer, theatrical trailer, and TV spot.

Reception 

Reviewing for AllMusic, Thom Jurek wrote that Portman "nails it once more" with her use of "elegiac strings and impressionistic piano" to match the "soft" seasonal scenes and "subdued tones in the film's frames", the "relatively low-key performances" of both leads, and the "languid changes" of the plot, noting that the theme of longing present in the film "is used as an almost painterly device to hold the music inside". He further stated, "There is an ache in this music, proposed by the notion of absence rather than sheer loneliness. Something is missing, and Portman's score brings back this feeling again and again". Jurek cited the composer's "use of space in allowing a cello to unravel in the lyric line" on "Pawprints" and "Il Mare" as a "beautiful device for revelation".

Brian McVicker of Soundtrack.Net also gave the album a favourable review and rated it 3.5 out of 5 stars, writing that the "song[s] and score work well in conjunction with each other, keeping a consistent tone from start to finish". He described the first five tracks as "winning, pleasant, low key offerings" and Portman's score as "an understated but lovely and engaging effort".

Release

Box office 
In its opening weekend, the film grossed $13.6 million and ranked fourth in the United States box office. By October 1, 2006, it had grossed $52,330,111 in the US and $114,830,111 worldwide.

Critical response 
The Lake House received mixed, but mostly negative, reviews from critics. On review aggregator website Rotten Tomatoes, the film has an approval rating of 35% based on reviews from 156 critics, with a weighted average score of 5.01/10. The site's critical consensus states: "The plot of The Lake House is a little too convoluted, and the film fails to pull off the sweeping romance it aims for." On Metacritic, it has a weighted average score of 52 out of 100 based on 34 critics, indicating "mixed or average reviews".

Roger Ebert gave the film its most positive review—he rated it 3.5 out of 4 stars—and felt that it succeeded despite being based on the impossible paradoxes established in the plot, saying that what he responded to was "its fundamental romantic impulse [that] makes us hope these two people will meet somehow". Addressing the film's logical inconsistencies, Ebert said he was not "bothered in the slightest" as "[a] time travel story works on emotional, not temporal, logic". He praised Bullock and Reeves in their respective roles, noting that a "great deal depends on the personalities involved", and called both "enormously likeable". The New York Timess A. O. Scott described the film as "wondrously illogical" and "completely preposterous, [but] not without charm". Echoing similar sentiments to Ebert, he noted that the film falls apart if "approach[ed] with a rational, skeptical mind", but felt that Auburn's script and Agresti's direction "smoothly handled" the "contrivances of the plot". He also expressed appreciation for the film's aesthetic, commenting that it was "elegant without being terribly showy, with a connoisseur's eye for Chicago's architectural glories". Scott concluded that overall the film is "a showcase for its stars, who seem gratifyingly comfortable in their own skin and delighted to be in each other's company again".

Conversely, Claudia Puig, writing for USA Today, said that The Lake House was "one of the more befuddling movies of recent years", and felt its premise "ma[de] no sense, no matter how you turn it around in your head. It attempts to be a romance, a time-traveling mystery and a meditation on loneliness. It doesn't succeed at any of the three". She further called it a "melodramatic romance" that "moves at a glacial pace" while also "tak[ing] itself too seriously", and concluded by saying that "Even if we suspend disbelief completely, The Lake House is unconvincing, unsatisfying and unmoving". Puig did acknowledge the chemistry between Reeves and Bullock, but noted that their moments together in the film were rare. Stax of IGN described the film as a "terminally slow, talky and surprisingly uneventful affair" that "never capitalizes on the magic that brings Kate and Alex together". He criticized the "contrived 'beat the clock' element" in the plot that "allow[ed] the characters to cheat fate", but failed to prove to the audience why they love each other and how they "complete" one another, as well as Reeves' monotonous cadence throughout the film, and said Bullock's acting was "disenchanted, almost blase...[f]or a woman supposedly deeply in love with a man she can't have". He did concede there were "a few fleeting moments of levity where the film comes alive", but felt things were "so turgid and lethargically paced that even the leads seem bored most of the time",  ultimately declaring the film "boring" and "devoid of passion". He gave it a 2.5 out of 5 stars rating, which the site later revised to a 5/10 score.

The OC Registers David Germain called the film a "tear-jerker whose convolutions elicit more chuckles than tears" and said it "would have been nice" if the DVD had included "commentary from the filmmakers so someone could explain the ridiculous lapses in logic" in response to its containing seven deleted scenes.

Accolades 
The film received a nomination for Choice Liplock (between Bullock and Reeves) at the 2006 Teen Choice Awards and won.

Home media 
The Lake House was released on DVD, Blu-ray Disc and HD DVD on September 26, 2006 by Warner Home Video. It was the first film to be simultaneously released on all three formats on the same day, and Warner became the first studio to issue a title in this manner. The single-disc DVD was initially available for region 1 territories only, in both widescreen and full-screen editions with 480i resolution—a region 2 compatible version was later released on October 9. Special features included deleted scenes, outtakes, and the film's theatrical trailer. The Blu-ray edition was a region-free single-disc release, with 1080i resolution and the same extras as its DVD counterpart.

Notes

References

External links 
 
 
 
 
 

2006 films
2006 romantic drama films
2000s romantic fantasy films
American remakes of South Korean films
Remakes of South Korean films
American romantic drama films
American romantic fantasy films
South Korean romantic drama films
South Korean romantic fantasy films
Films set in 2004
Films set in 2005
Films set in 2006
Films set in 2007
Films set in 2008
Films set in Chicago
Films set on lakes
Films about time travel
Films directed by Alejandro Agresti
Films scored by Rachel Portman
Films shot in Chicago
Village Roadshow Pictures films
Sidus Pictures films
Warner Bros. films
Magic realism films
Prediction in popular culture
Films set in Wisconsin
Films produced by Roy Lee
Vertigo Entertainment films
2000s English-language films
2000s American films
2000s South Korean films
English-language South Korean films